Kumari Kottam is a 1971 Indian Tamil-language film directed by P. Neelakantan. The film stars M. G. Ramachandran and Jayalalithaa, with Lakshmi, Sachu, S. A. Ashokan, V. K. Ramasamy, R. S. Manohar and Cho Ramaswamy in supporting roles. It was released on 26 January 1971.

Plot 

Somu agrees to marry his daughter to his close friend Muthaiya's son. Muthaiya has helped him in all instances. One day, he gets a letter from his late wife's cousin stating that Somu and his daughter must come to own Somu's father in law's wealth. He refuses the offer as he doesn't have money to go, Muthaiya sells his wife's jewellery to send him. Many years later, Somu and his daughter are leading a luxurious life. Muthaiya's son Gopal enters the house as a gardener. Soon Muthaiya comes to Somu to remind him of his promise to get his daughter married to his son. But he refuses stating he is a mere gardener forgetting all the old sacrifices. Muthaiya is offended in public and attempts suicide, but is saved at the last moment by Gopal. Gopal then promises to teach a lesson to Somu and his daughter.

Cast 
 M. G. Ramachandran as Gopal
 Jayalalithaa as Kumari and Record dancer Mayadevi
 Lakshmi as Uma, Sethupathi's daughter
 Sachu as Singhari
 S. A. Ashokan as Sethupathi, Uma's father
 V. K. Ramasamy as Somu
 R. S. Manohar as Rathnam, Kumari's uncle
 Muthaiyya as Muthaiya
 Cho Ramaswamy as Babu
 Karikol Raju
 Usilai Mani

Soundtrack 
The music was composed by M. S. Viswanathan.

Release and reception 
Kumari Kottam was released on 26 January 1971. Screen criticised the photography, choreography, art direction and music, saying that "With these credits more sophisticated, the very same film would have been ten times more appealing".

References

External links 
 

1970s Tamil-language films
1971 films
Films scored by M. S. Viswanathan